This page shows the results of the Men's Wrestling Competition at the 1987 Pan American Games, held from August 7 to August 23, 1987, in Indianapolis, United States.

Men's competition

Freestyle (– 48 kg)

Freestyle (– 52 kg)

Freestyle (– 57 kg)

Freestyle (– 62 kg)

Freestyle (– 68 kg)

Freestyle (– 74 kg)

Freestyle (– 82 kg)

Freestyle (– 90 kg)

Medal table

References
 Sports 123

Events at the 1987 Pan American Games
1987
P
International wrestling competitions hosted by the United States